Browns Mountain, also sometimes spelt Brown's Mountain, is a small submarine mountain – a seamount – lying in the south-western Pacific Ocean 38 km off the coast of New South Wales, Australia, about 50 km east of the city of Sydney. The waters around the seamount are about 600 m in depth, while the mountain itself rises some 133 m above the sea floor. It is a popular site for commercial and recreational fishing.

It got its name from Ernie Brown, the popular local Sydney fisherman who discovered it.

References

Seamounts of the Pacific Ocean
Fishing in Australia